Brian Mervin McMillan (born 22 December 1963) played 38 Test matches and 78 One Day Internationals for South Africa from 1991 to 1998. He was rated by many as the best all-rounder in the world in the mid-1990s, and won South African Cricket Annual Cricketer of the Year awards in 1991 and 1996.

McMillan was a right arm medium-pace bowler and right-handed batsman. He was also a leading slip fielder, and holds the highest percentage of catches per Test for an outfielder in South Africa Test cricket history.

International career
McMillan made his Test debut in November 1992, against India at Durban, in South Africa's first home Test match in over 20 years. He was a key member of the South African team post their re-admittance to world cricket in 1991. McMillan made his ODI debut in November 1991, against India at Eden Gardens.

Domestic career
In domestic cricket, he represented  Transvaal for four seasons from 1984–85 to 1988–89, and Western Province from 1989-90 until his retirement in the 1999–00 season. He also spent a season with Warwickshire in 1986.

Beyond cricket
McMillan has also been a professional teacher in Durban university. He currently heads an office automation firm in Cape Town.

Racism
McMillan used a racist term "coolie creeper" to a player of Asian origin in a domestic game in 1999. McMillan, who has represented the national team for several years, was severely reprimanded by the disciplinary committee of the United Cricket Board of South Africa (UCB) for advising a Western Province teammate to bowl a "coolie creeper" to an Indian batsman. "Coolie" is a derogatory term referring to a laborer of Indian descent.

References

External links
 

1963 births
Living people
Sportspeople from Welkom
South African cricketers
South Africa Test cricketers
South Africa One Day International cricketers
Gauteng cricketers
Warwickshire cricketers
Western Province cricketers
Cricketers at the 1992 Cricket World Cup
Cricketers at the 1996 Cricket World Cup
South African cricket coaches